Tarvizak (also Romanized as Ţarvīzak; also known as Tabrīzak) is a village in Afshariyeh Rural District, Khorramdasht District, Takestan County, Qazvin Province, Iran. At the 2006 census, its population was 994, in 267 families.

References 

Populated places in Takestan County